George Herbert Allen (August 16, 1923, Kusnacht, Switzerland – May 9, 2011, McKinleyville, California) was an American ichthyologist and fisheries scientist. His father was a US consul and they family moved to Calgary with his father's posting in 1927 and George remained there until he went to the University of Wyoming as an undergraduate where he graduated before entering the military during the Second World War. After the war he completed his master's and doctorate degrees at the University of Washington in 1956, where he met his wife, Beverly Robinson. He started a position at the Humboldt State University an association which was to last over 30 years, ending his career as a professor of fisheries. At HSU he played an important part in setting up the university's oceanography program and its graduate program in fisheries. He was awarded the President's Distinguished Service Award by the Humboldt State University and had a lab and part of the Arcata Wastewater Treatment Plant and Wildlife Sanctuary was named in his honor. Allen was nicknamed "Fishy" by the Arcata, California, city hall workers he co-operated with in the creation of its pioneering artificial marsh wastewater treatment facility. The toadfish genus Allenbatrachus was named in his honor by one of his former students, David W. Greenfield, for Allen's introduction of Greenfield to ichthyology.<ref name =  He was survived by his wife, Beverley, and their three daughters.

References

American ichthyologists
University of Washington alumni
University of Wyoming alumni
1923 births
2011 deaths
People from Küsnacht
Humboldt State University faculty
American expatriates in Switzerland
American expatriates in Canada
American military personnel of World War II